Leopold Heinrich von der Goltz (1745–1816) was a Prussian diplomat.

From 1789 to 1794, he was the Prussian ambassador to Russia.

1745 births
1816 deaths
Ambassadors of Prussia to the Russian Empire
18th-century diplomats